Deckerville High School is a public secondary school located in Deckerville, Michigan. The school serves about 250 students in grades 7 to 12 in the Deckerville Community Schools district.

References

External links 
Deckerville Community Schools

Public high schools in Michigan
Public middle schools in Michigan
Education in Sanilac County, Michigan
Buildings and structures in Sanilac County, Michigan